Chresmodidae is an extinct family of Mesozoic insects within the superorder Polyneoptera.

Genera
Chresmoda Late Jurassic-Cenomanian, Worldwide
Jurachresmoda Zhang, Ren & Shih, 2008 Middle Jurassic, Jiulongshan Formation
Sinochresmoda  Zhang, Ren & Pang, 2008 Early Cretaceous, Yixian Formation

Prochresmoda from the Triassic of Kyrgyzstan is not currently considered part of the group and is considered to be more closely related to Triassophasma and Palaeochresmoda.

Description
Chresmodidae are large enigmatic insects with very long specialized legs, probably adapted for skating on the water surface, similar to extant water skaters.

These Polyneoptera (partial syn Archaeorthoptera) of uncertain position have been considered aquatic, living on the water surface, probably predaceous on nektonic small animals.

They lived during the Cretaceous of Brazil, China, Lebanon, Spain, United Kingdom, as well as in the Jurassic of Germany and China, from ~166.0 to 94.3 Ma.

References

Prehistoric insect families
Triassic first appearances
Cretaceous extinctions
Polyneoptera